KDKE (102.5 FM, "Duke FM") is a classic country radio station located in Duluth, Minnesota (licensed to Superior, Wisconsin). KDKE is owned by Midwest Communications, which also owns WDSM, WDUL, KDAL, KDAL-FM and KTCO in Duluth. All the Duluth stations share the same studio location at 11 East Superior St. Suite 380, downtown Duluth. Most of KDKE's personalities are voice-tracked or syndicated.

History
The station was Top 40/CHR as "102.5 KZIO" (call sign now used by 104.3/94.1) until November 1996 when it switched to modern/alternative rock as "102.5 The Bear" with the KRBR-FM call sign. The Bear transitioned to active rock in 1998, and broadened its playlist by 2002. By 2006, "The Bear" moniker was dropped as the station branded as "102.5 KRBR" and added a significant amount of Classic Rock to its playlist to become a mainstream rock station. On March 3, 2008, KRBR-FM changed its call sign to KHQG, and began branding itself as "102.5 The Hog" while remaining with a mainstream rock format. In March 2009, KHQG shifted from mainstream rock to "Classic Rock 102.5." In the classic rock arena, 102.5 more solidly targeted the market's heritage classic rock station, KQDS-FM 94.9. The previous format had fallen between KQ and its active rock sister, 94X.

On August 30, 2010, KHQG flipped back to Top 40 (CHR) as "102.5 KDWZ", the branding and callsign a nod to KDWB-FM in Minneapolis. 

On September 21, 2015 at 10 am, KDWZ flipped to Classic Country as "102.5 Duke FM". It currently airs a mix of classic country music. Many KDWZ staff members, including The Jake and Tanner Morning Show, moved to My 95.7.

The KDWZ call sign was previously used with Top 40 stations in Des Moines, Iowa (was known on-air as "Z93", now oldies formatted KIOA) and Grand Forks, North Dakota (now country formatted KYCK) in the 1980s.

The station changed its call sign to the current KDKE on December 1, 2016.

References

External links

 

Radio stations in Superior, Wisconsin
Country radio stations in the United States
Radio stations established in 1979
Midwest Communications radio stations
1979 establishments in Wisconsin